Vice Admiral Guy Antony Robinson,  (born 9 April 1967) is a senior Royal Navy officer. Since September 2021, he has served as Chief of Staff of NATO Allied Command Transformation.

Naval career
Robinson joined the Royal Navy in 1986. He has served as commanding officer of three different ships including the patrol vessel, the destroyer, and the destroyer, . In 2008, he commanded Task Group 158.1 from the Khawr al Amaya Oil Terminal and ran operations in the Persian Gulf.

Positions held by Robinson include Flag Officer Sea Training staff, Commander Sea Training, and Assistant Chief of Staff (Warfare). In February 2015, he was appointed deputy commander of the United Kingdom Strike Force. He served in that position until April 2021 when Rear Admiral James Morley took over the post.

In July 2021, Robinson was appointed Chief of Staff to Supreme Allied Commander Transformation and was subsequently promoted to the rank of vice admiral.

Honours and decorations
In 2003, Robinson was Mentioned in Despatches for his services while commanding HMS Edinburgh. In 2013, Robinson was appointed an Officer of the Order of the British Empire in the 2013 Birthday Honours in recognition of his work when he took HMS Daring on the first operational deployment of a Type 45 destroyer to the Persian Gulf.

Robinson was appointed a Companion of the Order of the Bath in the 2023 New Year Honours.

Personal life
Robinson lives in Hampshire with his wife, Commodore Melanie Robinson, and their two adult children, Max and Maisie. He is a 2013 graduate of the Higher Command and Staff Course, a 2015 graduate of the US Coalition Force Maritime Component Commanders' Course, and a 2017 graduate of the Royal College of Defence Studies. Also, he is an alumnus of the Windsor Leadership Trust and holds a master's degree in Defence Studies from King's College London.

References

Living people
Royal Navy admirals
Graduates of the Royal College of Defence Studies
Alumni of King's College London
Companions of the Order of the Bath
Officers of the Order of the British Empire
20th-century Royal Navy personnel
21st-century Royal Navy personnel
Royal Navy personnel of the Gulf War
Royal Navy personnel of the Iraq War
1967 births